WHMT (740 AM, "Whiskey Country") is a radio station broadcasting a country music format. Licensed to Tullahoma, Tennessee, United States, the station is currently owned by Peter Bowman, through licensee Bowman Broadcasting, LLC. The station is named for its close proximity to prominent whiskey Distilleries in the area.

References

External links
Whiskey Country
Whiskey Country Radio Facebook

Country radio stations in the United States
HMT
Coffee County, Tennessee
Radio stations established in 1947
1947 establishments in Tennessee